The Puerto Princesa City National Science High School (Filipino: Pambansang Mataas na Paaralang Pang-Agham ng Lungsod ng Puerto Princesa) is a public science high school in  Puerto Princesa City, Palawan, Philippines. It is a DepEd-recognized science high school.

History 

The establishment of this school can be traced back to its proponent, Dr. Belen H. Magsino, the superintendent of the Division of Palawan, whose dream was to have a school comparable with some prestigious schools in Metro Manila. Her dream was realized with the support of former Speaker Ramon V. Mitra, Jr. and then former City Mayor Hon. Feliberto Oliveros Sr. in 1989. Due to her concern of bringing quality education and economic prosperity to Puerto Princesa City and Palawan, she thought of spearheading this public high school that will serve as a demonstration school for teachers and students alike.

In June 1990, 28 selected, courageous, idealistic pioneering students started with their teacher, Cristina G. Buenafe, from small, borrowed, dark rooms of Puerto Princesa Pilot Elementary School. One name used during its growing years was Pilot High School (Sicsican Annex).

When the pioneering batch was about to graduate in 1994, the class President Arni P. Alanis, Rhondie Garobo and other officers with Cristina G. Buenafe strongly defended before the Sangguniang Panglungsod to have its own identity. The name Puerto Princesa City High School was on their diplomas during commencement exercises in March 1994 as proof of support from the city government under the leadership of Hon. Edward S. Hagedorn, mayor.

Challenges and threats were posed to this institution but, due to commitment and leadership, they did not succeed. In its humble beginning it gained popularity and prestige when it became the champion in the first Quiz Bee sponsored by the government in 1992, the same year the government permit to operate 053 was given to the school.

From then on, its students have been bringing laurels such as in academic, K.I.D., L.I.S.T.O., arts, leadership, and other co-curricular activities. Former Deputy Speaker Hon. Alfredo "Amor" Abueg of the House of Representatives made a remarkable twist when he authored its conversion into a public science high school approved by the former President Fidel V. Ramos on March 4, 1997 by virtue of E.A. 8287

This institution has lived up to the challenges of its mentors; first it pioneered programs like Conceptual Approach in teaching reading of Dr. Aurora H. Roldan, a renowned international reading specialist (1994); Environmental Science PTFPP and DepEd (1995); TSD-MCP Thinking Skills Development for Maximized Cognitive Performance (1998); Distance Learning (Open High School 2000); and (CBI) Content-Based Instruction (2002).

While extending the delivery of quality education, boosted the morale of its faculty. The leader teacher Cristina G. Buenafe was awarded as one of the outstanding public secondary high school teachers in 1999 and as one of the outstanding alumni of Holy Trinity College. It got further recognition when one of its teachers, Dr. Rolando A. Taha became an Education Supervisor in the Division of Puerto Princesa City in 2001.

Today, this school lies on 30,000 sq. m. lot courtesy of the city government of Puerto Princesa during the administration of Hon. Edward S. Hagedorn and the City Council, in the heart of Puerto Princesa City. It's behind the National Irrigation Administration and New City Hall at Sta. Monica, with five buildings, 15 highly competent teachers, two industrious non-teaching personnel, an improvised computer room with 23 computers and access to internet, supportive parents, self-directed Students Supreme Council under the Dominican way of responsive leadership and independent students.

This institution was nominated as Regional Science High School in November 2003 to cater to the needs of the intellectually gifted and science-inclined students of the region. Due to catchments site and in the curriculum/enrollment, it did not win. Nevertheless, another milestone in public secondary education was obtained by this school when the DepEd Bureau of Secondary Education allowed the regional science curriculum to be offered beginning SY 2004-2005. The science fair is one of the strengths of the school. During the "Pagliawan" and "Perez" era, the school earned respect in the city because of consecutive championships. At present, there were 92 freshmen who rigorously adjusting with the curriculum especially with the inclusion of research 1 and Computer Education instead of Values Education & Technology & Home Economics.

This institution through its principal was selected as the only secondary school in region IV MIMAROPA for project Sterling Silver, a peer acceleration system on November 8–11, 2004 in Baguio City. It is taking its massive to uplift physical aspects through the support of Miguel Padon, the board of the directors presidents and his fellow officers, parents and other authorities.

External links 

Schools in Puerto Princesa
Science high schools in the Philippines